The Very Best of is a compilation album by British soul–dance singer Dina Carroll, released in 2001 on the Mercury label.

The album reached number 15 on the UK Albums Chart in June 2001 achieving Gold status.

Track listing

References

Dina Carroll albums
2001 compilation albums
Mercury Records compilation albums
Albums produced by Peter Collins (record producer)
Albums produced by David Cole (record producer)